The 95th Russell's Infantry were an infantry regiment of the British Indian Army. They could trace their origins to 1813, when they were raised as the 2nd Battalion of the Russell Brigade for the Princely state of Hyderabad. Until 1853, the regiment was part of the Nizam of Hydrabad's Army, then after signing of a treaty with the then Governor-General of India, The Nizam's Contingent was renamed as the Hyderabad Contingent and became part of the regular Indian Army.

The regiment fought in the Battle of Mahidpur during the Third Anglo-Maratha War. They then participated in the Siege of Nowah and the later Capture of Nowah.  They next participated in the annexation of Burma during the Second Burmese War.

After the First World War the Indian government reformed its army, moving from single battalion regiments to multi-battalion regiments. In 1922, the 95th Russell's Infantry became the 10th (Training) Battalion, 19th Hyderabad Regiment. This regiment was allocated to the Indian Army after independence.

Predecessor names
2nd Battalion of the Russell Brigade - 1813
2nd Regiment of Infantry, Nizam's Army - 1826
2nd Infantry, Hyderabad Contingent - 1854
95th Russell's Infantry -  1903

References

Moberly, F.J. (1923). Official History of the War: Mesopotamia Campaign, Imperial War Museum. 

British Indian Army infantry regiments
Military units and formations established in 1813
Military units and formations disestablished in 1922
Military history of the Madras Presidency
Indian World War I regiments